In enzymology, a cytokinin 7-β-glucosyltransferase is an enzyme that catalyzes the chemical reaction

UDP-glucose + N6-alkylaminopurine  UDP + N6-alkylaminopurine-7-β-D-glucoside

Thus, the two substrates of this enzyme are UDP-glucose and N6-alkylaminopurine, whereas its two products are UDP and N6-alkylaminopurine-7-β-D-glucoside.

This enzyme belongs to the family of glycosyltransferases, specifically the hexosyltransferases.  The systematic name of this enzyme class is UDP-glucose:N6-alkylaminopurine 7-glucosyltransferase. Other names in common use include uridine diphosphoglucose-zeatin 7-glucosyltransferase, and cytokinin 7-glucosyltransferase.

References

 
 

EC 2.4.1
Enzymes of unknown structure